Rink Point is a rocky point on the northwest coast of James Ross Island, 2 nautical miles (3.7 km) east of Carlson Island. The name arose because, during a visit by a Falkland Islands Dependencies Survey (FIDS) party in August 1952, the point was surrounded by a large area of slippery, snow-free sea ice resembling a skating rink.
 

Headlands of James Ross Island